UAAP Season 85 is the 2022–23 athletic year of the University Athletic Association of the Philippines (UAAP). Season 85 theme is "Rise As One", and the season host is the Adamson University. With just seven events in Season 84, the collegiate league will be bringing back the full athletic calendar of events for Season 85.

The year 2022 will thus hold two UAAP seasons. UAAP Season 84 was held starting March 26, 2022, and Season 85 started on October 1, 2022.

Opening ceremony was a pre-recorded one that commenced at 1:00 pm (PHT) on UAAP Varsity Channel.

Sports calendar 
This is the calendar of sports events of UAAP Season 85. The list includes the tournament host schools and the venues.

First Semester

Second Semester

Basketball 

The tournament started on October 1, 2022, at the SM Mall of Asia Arena and games are scheduled three times a week (every Wednesdays, Saturdays and Sundays). Four basketball games are scheduled every Wednesdays, and two games every Saturdays and Sundays. All teams play in the Wednesday play dates. The reason behind the quick tournament is to give way for the fifth window of the FIBA World Cup 2023 Asian Qualifiers in November. The men's and women's basketball tournaments still follows the same format: A double-round elimination stage, semi-finals (final four), and best-of-three finals.

The Coach's Challenge system implemented in both men's and women's basketball tournaments as part of the innovation this Season 85. This is in accordance with one of the new rules of the world basketball governing body FIBA.

The playing venue of the basketball games were not only held at the SM Mall of Asia Arena in Season 85. Basketball games were played in various venues unlike in Season 84 where the entirety of the basketball tournament was held only in the SM Mall of Asia Arena in a bubble set-up due to the COVID-19 pandemic. The UAAP were expand out of the Mall of Asia Arena and back to other venues for the Season 85 basketball tournament. Apart from SM Mall of Asia Arena, the league returned for games at the Araneta Coliseum in Quezon City, the PhilSports Arena (formerly ULTRA) in Pasig City, and the Ynares Center in Antipolo.

Further pre-pandemic features of this season's basketball tournament also included the return of weekend double-header afternoon schedules, the return of the women's collegiate and boys' high school tournaments, and patron/VIP arena seating for fans.

Kicking off the tournament at MOA on opening day (Saturday, October 1) were the matches between host Adamson and UST at 2 pm (PHT), and La Salle versus defending champion UP at 4 pm (PHT).

Second day (Sunday, October 2) hostilities were the games between UE and NU, which started at 2 pm (PHT) and still at the MOA Arena, followed by the match between Ateneo and FEU at 4 pm (PHT).

Men's tournament

Elimination round

Playoffs

Awards

Women's tournament

Elimination round

Playoffs

Awards

Boys' tournament

Elimination round

Playoffs

Awards

Volleyball 

The tournament started on February 25, 2023, at the SM Mall of Asia Arena and games are scheduled three times a week (every Wednesdays, Saturdays and Sundays). Four volleyball games are scheduled every Wednesdays, and two games every Saturdays and Sundays. All teams play in the Wednesday play dates. Both collegiate and high school volleyball tournaments still follows the same format: A double-round elimination stage, semi-finals (final four), and best-of-three finals.

The Video Challenge system implemented in both men's and women's volleyball tournaments as part of the innovation this Season 85. This is in accordance with one of the new rules of the world volleyball governing body FIVB. The first time the UAAP implemented the Video Challenge rule was back in 2020, but it did not last as the season got canceled at the onset of the COVID-19 pandemic. And will only be ready to use from second round of the tournament.

The playing venue of the volleyball games were not only held at the SM Mall of Asia Arena in Season 85. Volleyball games were played in various venues unlike in Season 84 where the entirety of the volleyball tournament was held only in the SM Mall of Asia Arena in a closed-circuit set-up due to the COVID-19 pandemic. The UAAP were expand out of the Mall of Asia Arena and back to other venues for the Season 85 basketball tournament. Apart from SM Mall of Asia Arena, the league returned for games at the Araneta Coliseum in Quezon City, the Filoil EcoOil Centre in San Juan City and the PhilSports Arena (formerly ULTRA) in Pasig City.

Further pre-pandemic features of this season's volleyball tournament also included the return of weekend double-header afternoon schedules, the return of the men's collegiate, boys' and girls' high school tournaments, and patron/VIP arena seating for fans.

Kicking off the tournament at MOA on opening day (Saturday, February 25) were the matches between host Adamson and UE at 10 am and 12 pm (PHT), and Ateneo versus defending champion NU at 2 and 4 pm (PHT).

Second day (Sunday, February 26) hostilities were the games between UP and FEU, which started at 10 am and 12 pm (PHT) and still at the MOA Arena, followed by the match between La Salle and UST at 2 and 4 pm (PHT).

Men's tournament

Elimination round

Playoffs

Women's tournament

Elimination round

Playoffs

Boys' tournament

Elimination round

Playoffs

Girls' tournament

Elimination round

Playoffs

Beach volleyball 
The UAAP Season 85 beach volleyball tournament began on November 19, 2022. The tournament venue is at the Sands SM by the Bay, SM Mall of Asia in Pasay, Metro Manila. University of the East is the tournament host. The format is a single round-robin in the elimination round, a single-elimination in the battle for third and a best-of-three series in the finals.

Men's tournament

Elimination round

Team standings

Match-up results

Playoffs

Awards 
 Most Valuable Player: 
 Rookie of the Year:

Women's tournament

Elimination round

Team standings

Match-up results

Playoffs

Awards 
 Most Valuable Player: 
 Rookie of the Year:

Football

Men's tournament

Elimination round

Team standings

Badminton 
The UAAP Season 85 Badminton tournament began on October 29, 2022. The tournament venue is the Centro Atletico Badminton Center in Camp Crame. The format is a round-robin. National University is the tournament host.

The Finals matchups of the men's and women's tournaments were broadcast live for the first time on November 13 on the UAAP Varsity Channel.

Men's tournament

Elimination round

Team standings

Match-up results

Playoffs

Awards 
 Most Valuable Players:

Women's tournament

Elimination round

Team standings

Match-up results

Playoffs

Awards 
 Most Valuable Player: 
 Rookie of the Year:

Table tennis 
The UAAP Season 85 table tennis tournament began on November 20, 2022. The tournament venue is the Makati Coliseum. De La Salle University is the tournament host.

Men's tournament

Elimination round

Team standings

Match-up results

Playoffs

Awards 
 Most Valuable Player: 
 Rookie of the Year:

Women's tournament

Elimination round

Team standings

Match-up results

Playoffs

Awards 
 Most Valuable Player: 
 Rookie of the Year:

Boys' tournament

Elimination round

Team standings

Match-up results

Playoffs

Awards 
 Most Valuable Player: 
 Rookie of the Year:

Girls' tournament

Elimination round

Team standings

Match results

Playoffs

Awards 
 Most Valuable Player: 
 Rookie of the Year:

Swimming 
The UAAP swimming championships were held from November 24–27, 2022 at the Teofilo Yldefonso Swimming Pool in Manila.

Ranking is determined by a point system, similar to that of the overall championship. The points given are based on the swimmer's/team's finish in the finals of an event, which include only the top eight finishers from the preliminaries. The gold medalist(s) receive 15 points, silver gets 12, bronze has 10. The following points: 8, 6, 4, 2 and 1 are given to the rest of the participating swimmers/teams according to their order of finish.

Men's tournament

Team standings

Awards 
 Most Valuable Player: 
 Rookie of the Year:

Women's tournament

Team standings

Awards 
 Most Valuable Player: 
 Rookie of the Year:

Boys' tournament

Team standings

Awards 
 Most Valuable Player: 
 Rookie of the Year:

Girls' tournament

Team standings

Awards 
 Most Valuable Player: 
 Rookie of the Year:

Performance sports

Cheerdance 
The UAAP Season 85 cheerdance competition will be held on December 10, 2022, at 4 p.m., at the SM Mall of Asia Arena in Pasay. Cheerdance competition is an exhibition event. Points for the overall championship are not awarded to the participating schools.

This Season 85 brings back the maximum 25 performers on the floor and execute a six-minute routine.

Team standings

General championship summary 
The general champion is determined by a point system. The system gives 15 points to the champion team of a UAAP event, 12 to the runner-up, and 10 to the third placer. The following points: 8, 6, 4, 2 and 1 are given to the rest of the participating teams according to their order of finish.

Medals table

General championship tally

See also 
 NCAA Season 98

References 

University Athletic Association of the Philippines seasons
2022 in Philippine sport
2023 in Philippine sport
2022 in multi-sport events
2023 in multi-sport events